OpenIRIS is the open source version of IRIS, a semantic desktop that enables users to create a "personal map" across their office-related information objects. The name IRIS is an acronym for "Integrate. Relate. Infer. Share."

IRIS includes a machine-learning platform to help automate this process. It provides "dashboard" views, contextual navigation, and relationship-based structure across an extensible suite of office applications, including a calendar, web and file browser, e-mail client, and instant messaging client.

IRIS was built as part of SRI International's CALO project, a very large artificial intelligence funded by the Defense Advanced Research Projects Agency (DARPA) under its Personalized Assistant that Learns program.

 Integrate: IRIS harvests and unifies the data from multiple, independently developed applications such as email (Mozilla), web browser (Mozilla), file manager, calendar (OpenOffice), and Chat (XMPP).
 Relate: IRIS stores this data an ontology-based KB that supports rich representation and connection to the user's worklife. In IRIS, you can express things like: "this file, authored by this person, was presented at this meeting about this project".
 Infer: IRIS comes with a learning framework that makes it possible for online learning algorithms (e.g. clustering, classification, extraction, prioritization, association, summarization, various predictors) to plug-in and reason about the rich data and events presented to them. In addition to learning through observation of user activity, CALO's learning algorithms have access to interface mechanisms in IRIS where they can get feedback from the user.
 Share: The knowledge created in IRIS by the user and by CALO will eventually be made sharable with selected team members. Currently, the ability to share content across IRIS users is a future capability.

Related Work 

 Haystack
 Chandler (software)

References

Further reading

CALO-funded research resulted in more than five hundred publications across all fields of artificial intelligence. Here are a few:

 IRIS: Integrate. Relate. Infer. Share. Adam Cheyer, Jack Park, and Richard Giuli. Workshop on The Semantic Desktop - Next Generation Personal Information Management and Collaboration Infrastructure at the International Semantic Web Conference (ISWC2005). 6 November 2005, Galway, Ireland.
 Building an Intelligent Personal Assistant, Karen Myers. AAAI Invited Talk, July 2006.
 Deploying a Personalized Time Management Agent, P. Berry, K. Conley, M. Gervasio, B. Peintner, T. Uribe, and N. Yorke-Smith. Proceedings of the Fifth International Joint Conference on Autonomous Agents and Multi Agent Systems (AAMAS’06) Industrial Track, Hakodate, Japan, May 2006.

External links 
 OpenIRIS Project Homepage
 SRI PAL/CALO Project

Artificial intelligence
SRI International